Épaulard is a French remotely operated underwater vehicle of the Ifremer. She was the first robotic submarine capable of taking photographs at a depth of 6000 metres. Built in 1980, Épaulard was decommissioned in 1991.

Design 
Épaulard was designed and built by ECA Group She was teleoperated from a support ship by means of acoustic signals. While the submarine herself displaced three tonnes, the entire system would use up 35m² of deck space and weight 20 tonnes; such systems were installed on a number of Ifremer ships such as Noroît, Suroît, Atalante or Jean Charcot.

In 1983, she was upgraded with a vertical propeller and a remote TV system with acoustic broadcast of images.

Career 
Starting in 1981, Épaulard was used for the study of nodules and shipwrecks on the Pacific seafloor.

She was decommissioned in 1991, having performed 200 missions.

Notes and references

Notes

References

Bibliography 

Robotic submarines
Remotely operated underwater vehicles